The "Napoleon complex", known informally as small man syndrome, is a syndrome normally attributed to people of short stature. It is characterized by overly-aggressive or domineering social behavior, such as lying about earnings, and carries the implication that such behavior is compensatory for the subject's physical or social shortcomings. In psychology, the Napoleon complex is regarded as a derogatory social stereotype.

Etymology 

The Napoleon complex is named after Napoleon, the first Emperor of the French. Common folklore supposes that Napoleon compensated for his lack of height by seeking power, war, and conquest. This view was fostered and encouraged by the British, who waged a propaganda campaign to diminish their enemy in print and art, during his life and after his death. In 1803, he was mocked in British newspapers as a short-tempered small man. Other historians assert that he was  because he was measured on a British island 28 years after the French adopted the metric system. Napoleon was often seen with his Imperial Guard, which contributed to the perception of his being short because the Imperial Guards were tall men selected for their height. Other names for the purported condition include  Napoleonic complex, Napoleon syndrome and short man syndrome.

Research
In 2007, a study by the University of Central Lancashire concluded that the Napoleon complex (described in terms of the theory that shorter men are more aggressive to dominate those who are taller than they are) is a myth. The study discovered that short men were less likely to lose their temper than men of average height. The experiment involved subjects dueling each other with sticks, with one subject deliberately rapping the other's knuckles. Heart monitors revealed that the taller men were more likely to lose their tempers and hit back. University of Central Lancashire lecturer Mike Eslea commented that "when people see a short man being aggressive, they are likely to think it is due to his size, simply because that attribute is obvious and grabs their attention".

The Wessex Growth Study is a community-based longitudinal study conducted in the UK that monitored the psychological development of children from school entry to adulthood. The study was controlled for potential effects of gender and socioeconomic status, and found that "no significant differences in personality functioning or aspects of daily living were found which could be attributable to height"; this functioning included generalizations associated with the Napoleon complex, such as risk-taking behaviours.

Abraham Buunk, a professor at the University of Groningen in the Netherlands, concluded that he had evidence of the small man syndrome.

In popular culture 
Singer-songwriter Mariah Carey referenced the Napoleon complex in her 2009 song "Obsessed", accusing someone of being "all fired up with [their] Napoleon complex". The song is widely believed to be a response to rapper Eminem, who had made disparaging remarks about Carey in multiple previous songs.

See also
Human height
Heightism
Inferiority complex

References

Slang
Napoleon
1800s neologisms
Eponyms